Boy Oh Boy may refer to:

 "Boy Oh Boy" (Alexandra Stan song), 2017
 "Boy Oh Boy" (Racey song), 1979
 "Boy Oh Boy" (The Wilkinsons song), 1999
 "Boy Oh Boy" (Diplo and GTA song), 2013

See also
Boy O'Boy, a 2003 novel
 "Oh boy, oh boy, oh boy!", a 1946 song written by Lasse Dahlquist
 Oh Boy (disambiguation)
 Boyboy (disambiguation)
 Boy (disambiguation)